Tonje Løseth (born 1 January 1991) is a Norwegian handball player. She plays for the club Odense Håndbold

Achievements
Danish Cup:
Gold: 2019

French Women's First League Championship:
Gold: 2021

French Women's Cup Championship:
Gold: 2021

EHF Champions League:
Silver: 2020/2021

References

1991 births
Living people
Sportspeople from Bergen
Norwegian female handball players
Norwegian expatriate sportspeople in Denmark
Norwegian expatriate sportspeople in France
Norwegian expatriate sportspeople in Germany
Expatriate handball players
21st-century Norwegian women